Grace Min (born May 6, 1994) is an American tennis player who won the 2011 US Open girls' singles title. She also won the 2011 Wimbledon girls' doubles title with Eugenie Bouchard. Min's highest singles ranking is 97, set on 2 March 2015, and she peaked at No. 308 in the doubles rankings, on 17 September 2012.

On 3 February 2015, Min was ranked in the top 100 in singles for the first time at No. 100, making her the 14th highest ranked American player.

Tennis career

2006–07
Her first tournament was the Eddie Herr International Junior Tennis Championships, an under-14 tournament at the Bollettieri Sports Academy. Aged 12 and seeded tenth, Grace received a bye into the second round, where she was defeated by Nataliya Pintusova, 6–3, 6–4.

Her next tournament was the Prince Cup in Miami, Florida. In the first round, she defeated tenth seed Melina Ferrero, for her first victory of the year. She then fell to qualifier Laurie Gingras in the second round, in straight sets.

Her final tournament of the year was the Junior Orange Bowl in Coral Gables, Florida. In the first round, she crushed German Sarah Ott 6–1, 6–0, and backed it up by another straight-sets victory over qualifier Yuki Kristina Chiang, 6–1, 6–2. Next, she demolished Donna Vekić 6–0, 6–1, but was defeated by Chanelle van Nguyen, 6–3, 6–1 in the fourth round.

The first tournament of the year was an under-14 tournament in Bolton, England, but Grace lost in the second round to ninth seed Nastja Kolar, 6–2, 6–3. She then headed to Tarbes, France, where she was awarded a wildcard for the qualifying draw of the Petits As. She qualified for the tournament, defeating Eugenie Prince, Manon Peral and Marine Even all in straight sets to qualify. She reached the semifinals of the tournament before her unexpected run was cut short by top-seeded Anna Orlik, in two sets. Her success in the tournament greatly improved her ranking.

Grace then played the USTA National Open and the Easter Bowl, losing in the first round of the former and the quarterfinals of the latter. She then headed to Waco, Texas for the ITF Spring Circuit, where she lost in the third round to tenth-seed Hsu Chieh-yu, 1–6, 3–6.

She won the USTA National Open in Marietta, Georgia, defeating compatriot Carolyn Chupa, Amelia Martinez and top seed Courtney Griffith to reach the quarterfinals, where she overcame Alina Jerjomina, in three sets. In the semifinals, she played another tough match against Rachel Kahan, eventually prevailing 6–2, 2–6, 6–3. In the final, she defeated Elizabeth Begley 6–0, 6–1. She then won the Peach State Classic in Norcross, Georgia without dropping a set.

She then played the U.S. Junior Grass Court Championships in Philadelphia, losing in the first round. Following this loss, she headed to Georgia to play the under-18 USTA National Open in Stone Mountain, losing in the quarterfinals. Grace rebounded, winning two titles back to back, the National Claycourt Championships in Plantation, Florida and the National Hardcourt Championships in Peachtree City, Georgia. These were the last tournaments Grace won that year. From August to December, she played five under-18 tournaments, two under-16 tournaments and one under-14 event, her best result being a quarterfinals appearance at the Dunlop Orange Bowl.

2008–11
Grace started the year at the Eastbourne International where she defeated Morven McCuloch, Patricia Martins, Leolia Jeanjean and second seed Irina Khromacheva to reach the final, where she was defeated by Polina Leykina, 6–2, 6–2. Her next tournament was the Les Petits As, where she lost in the third round to Jessica Ren, and was unable to defend her points from the previous year. She then fell in the first round of the USTA National Open to eventual champion, Danielle Collins, in straight sets. She also suffered two more first round exit at the USTA International Spring Championships and the Easter Bowl ITF.

In May, Grace played her first professional tournament at a $25k event in Raleigh, North Carolina. She crushed Sianna Simmons in the first round of qualifying 6–2, 6–1 but was eliminated from the tournament by Hsu Chieh-yu in the second round. She then lost in the second round of the USTA National Open in Norcross, Georgia.

Grace then qualified for her first ITF senior main draw at a $10k event in Sumter, South Carolina. In the first round of the main draw, she crushed fellow qualifier Eugenie Bouchard 6–0, 6–3 but lost to fifth seed Anna Wishink, in the second round.

Grace played two more $10k events in the United States, losing during the qualifying of both. She then won her first title of the year at the under 18 USTA National Open in her hometown, dropping only one set in the tournament. Grace then lost in the quarterfinals of the under 18 National Clay Court Championships and the second round of the US International Hardcort Championships.

Grace was then awarded a wildcard for the junior US Open, her first Grand Slam championship. However, she was defeated in the first round of qualifying by Heather Watson, 7–5, 6–0. Following this loss, she headed to Lexington for the Under-18 Kentucky International Junior Tennis Derby, where she qualified for the main draw, but was eliminated in the first round by Michaela Boev, 6–2, 6–0. She then fell in the third round of the USTA ITF Junior Circuit – Georgia in Atlanta to Elizabeth Begley, in two sets.

Grace then received a wildcard for the maindraw of a $50k professional event in Lawrenceville, Georgia. In the first round, she overcame countrywoman Julia Cohen in three sets. However, she was crushed by sixth seed Angela Haynes, 6–0, 6–1 in the second round. With these professional tournaments, she established her first WTA ranking. She lost in the second round of an under-18 tournament in South Carolina, before reaching a final in Florida. She then fell in the first round of the Eddie Herr International Junior Tennis Championships as a wildcard to sixth seed Yana Buchina of Russia, in a three-setter. Grace's final tournament of the year was the Dunlop Orange Bowl, where she managed to defend her points by reaching the quarterfinals.

2012–present
In 2012, she won her first ITF Circuit title at $25k Innisbrook, Florida in January, as a qualifier, she won seven matches in a row, defeating Catalina Castaño, Lauren Davis and Gail Brodsky.

Grace reached another final at $25k Clearwater, Florida in March, where she defeated world No. 65, Anastasiya Yakimova, in the quarterfinals but lost the final to Garbiñe Muguruza.

She won her second ITF Circuit title at the $50k Indian Harbour Beach, Florida defeating top-seed and world No. 97, Irina Falconi, in the first round, Krista Hardebeck 2–6, 7–5, 6–1 in the semifinals, and defeated Maria Sanchez, 6–4, 7–6.

At the French Open, Grace was 20th seed in the women's singles qualifying draw and won three matches to enter the main competition. In the first round, she lost to Garbiñe Muguruza, in straight sets.

In January 2015, Min entered the Auckland Open and Hobart International tournaments but lost in the qualifying first round in both. Then also in January at the Australian Open, she was unseeded playing in the women's singles main draw for the first time and lost to 14th seed Sara Errani, 1–6, 0–6.

Grand Slam performance timelines

Singles 
Current after the 2021 US Open.

Doubles

ITF Circuit finals

Singles: 22 (12 titles, 10 runner–ups)

Doubles: 2 (1 title, 1 runner–up)

Notes

References

External links
 
 

1994 births
Living people
Min Grace
American people of Korean descent
Korean-American tennis players
Tennis players from Atlanta
Wimbledon junior champions
US Open (tennis) junior champions
Grand Slam (tennis) champions in girls' singles
Grand Slam (tennis) champions in girls' doubles
Sportspeople from Boca Raton, Florida
21st-century American women